The 2004 ITU Triathlon World Championships were held in Madeira, Portugal on May 9, 2004.

Medal summary

References
ITU World Championships Results (Archived 2009-09-25)

2004
World Championships
Triathlon World Championships
International sports competitions hosted by Portugal
Triathlon competitions in Portugal